Savign. may refer to:

Francesco Savignone, botanist with the standard authority abbreviation Savign.
Marie Jules César Savigny, botanist with the standard authority abbreviation Savigny